Ministry of Energy, New and Renewable Energy Maharashtra or MAHAURJA is a ministry of Government of Maharashtra. The Ministry is currently headed by Devendra Fadnavis, a Deputy Chief Minister of Maharashtra and Cabinet Minister.

The Ministry is mainly responsible for research and development, intellectual property protection, and international cooperation, promotion, and coordination in renewable energy sources such as wind power, small hydro, biogas, and solar power. The broad aim of the Ministry is to develop and deploy new and renewable energy for supplementing the energy requirements of India.

The Ministry is headquartered in Mantralaya, Mumbai, Mumbai. According to the Central New and Renewable Energy Ministry's 2012–2013 annual report, India has made significant advances in several renewable energy sectors which include, Solar energy, Wind power, and Hydroelectricity.

Head office

List of Cabinet Ministers

List of Ministers of State

Mission
The mission of the Ministry is to bring in Energy Security; Increase the share of clean power; increase Energy Availability and Access; improve Energy Affordability; and maximise Energy Equity.

Key functional area

The major functional area or Allocation of Business of MNRE are:

 Commission for Additional Sources of Energy (CASE);
 Indian Renewable Energy Development Agency (IREDA);
 Integrated Rural Energy Programme (IREP);
 Research and development of Biogas and programmes relating to Biogas units;
 Solar Energy including Solar Photovoltaic devices and their development, production and applications;
 Programme relating to improved chulhas and research and development thereof;
 All matters relating to small/mini/micro hydel projects of and below 25 MW capacities;
 Research and development of other non-conventional/renewable sources of energy and programmes relating thereto;
 Tidal energy;
 Geothermal Energy;
 Biofuel: (i) National Policy; (ii) research, development and demonstration on transport, stationary and other applications; (iii) setting up of a National Bio-fuels Development Board and strengthening the existing institutional mechanism; and (iv) overall coordination.

See also
 Energy policy of India
 National hydrogen energy road map
 Renewable energy in India
 Wind power in India

References

External links

Official website
Alternate Hydro Energy Centre
Centre for Wind Energy Technology
Department of Science and Technology, India
Indian Renewable Energy Development Agency

Government agencies for energy (India)
Renewable energy in India
Maharashtra
Government ministries of Maharashtra